The 2014–15 Charlotte Checkers season is the American Hockey League franchise's 5th season in the city of Charlotte, North Carolina.

Off-season

Standings

Divisional standings

Conference standings

 indicates team has clinched division and a playoff spot
 indicates team has clinched a playoff spot
 indicates team has been eliminated from playoff contention

Schedule and results

Pre-season

Regular season

Player statistics

Skaters
Note: GP = Games played; G = Goals; A = Assists; Pts = Points; +/− = Plus/minus; PIM = Penalty minutes
Source:

†Denotes player spent time with another team before joining team. Stats reflect time with the team only.
‡Left the team mid-season
*Rookie

Goaltenders
Note: GP = Games played; TOI = Time on ice; W = Wins; L = Losses; GA = Goals against; GAA = Goals against average; SV = Saves; SA = Shots against; SV% = Save percentage; SO = Shutouts; G = Goals; A = Assists; PIM = Penalty minutes
Source

‡Left the team mid-season
*Rookie

Roster

Updated March 3, 2015.

|}

Awards and records

Awards

References

External links
 Official Website of the AHL

Charlotte Checkers
Charlotte Checkers
Charlotte Checkers
Charl
Charl